Jorge Luís dos Santos Dias (born 11 February 1976), known as Jorge Luís, is a Brazilian retired footballer who played as a left back.

Club career
Born in Rio de Janeiro, Jorge Luís started his career at local Fluminense Football Club, playing with the team through consecutive relegations to the Série B and Série C. In 2001 he moved to Santa Cruz Futebol Clube in the Série A, in a relegation-ending season.

In August 2002 Luís left for Portugal and signed for Varzim SC, suffering yet another relegation. The following year he stayed in the north of the country, joining fellow Primeira Liga club S.C. Braga.

During his -season spell in Minho, Jorge Luís was a regular starter, as the team achieved two fifth positions and one fourth, with the subsequent UEFA Cup qualifications. In January 2006 he moved to FC Dynamo Moscow in Russia for €3 million and Nuno Frechaut, as the side signed several Portuguese or Portugal-based players in that timeframe (Danny, Derlei, Maniche, etc.). After just six Premier League games, however, he returned to his previous club, on loan.

In July 2007 Luís returned to his country and joined Sport Club Internacional, signing a one-year contract. In May of the following year, he signed for Porto Alegre Futebol Clube in the Rio Grande do Sul State League (second division); in August he moved teams again, signing with Clube de Regatas Brasil but leaving after only one second level appearance.

In late October 2009, after one year out of football, 33-year-old Luís returned to Portugal and joined C.D. Trofense in the Liga de Honra. He retired at the end of the season, aged 34.

Honours
Campeonato Brasileiro Série C: 1999

References

External links

CBF data 

1976 births
Living people
Footballers from Rio de Janeiro (city)
Brazilian footballers
Association football defenders
Campeonato Brasileiro Série A players
Fluminense FC players
Santa Cruz Futebol Clube players
Sport Club Internacional players
Porto Alegre Futebol Clube players
Clube de Regatas Brasil players
Primeira Liga players
Liga Portugal 2 players
Varzim S.C. players
S.C. Braga players
C.D. Trofense players
Russian Premier League players
FC Dynamo Moscow players
Brazilian expatriate footballers
Expatriate footballers in Portugal
Expatriate footballers in Russia
Brazilian expatriate sportspeople in Portugal
Brazilian expatriate sportspeople in Russia